Maidiping Township is an rural township in Sangzhi County, Zhangjiajie, Hunan Province, China.

Administrative division
The township is divided into 8 villages, the following areas: Guangjiashan Village, Maidiping Village, Luyang Village, Huangshanyu Village, Lishanya Village, Qingfengxi Village, Nongkezhan Village, and Shuitianping Village (广家山村、麦地坪村、芦阳村、黄山峪村、栗山亚村、青峰溪村、农科站村、水田坪村).

References

External links

Former towns and townships of Sangzhi County